This is an alphabetical list of Berlin S-Bahn stations.  As of 2023, there are 168 active stations.

A

B

C

D

E

F

G

H

I

J

K

L

M

N

O

P

R

S

T

V

W

Y

Z

External links
Up to date map (PDF)

 
Berlin S-Bahn stations, List of
Railway stations (S-Bahn)
Berlin